Knyazhskaya is a rural locality (a village) in Klyazminskoye Rural Settlement, Kovrovsky District, Vladimir Oblast, Russia. The population was 19 as of 2010.

Geography 
Knyazhskaya is located 25 km northeast of Kovrov (the district's administrative centre) by road. Guzhikha is the nearest rural locality.

References 

Rural localities in Kovrovsky District